BBC East is one of BBC's English Regions covering Norfolk, Suffolk, Cambridgeshire, northern Buckinghamshire, and the majority of Northamptonshire, Bedfordshire, Hertfordshire and Essex. It is headquartered in The Forum, Norwich since 2003. It was also separated into two areas, one with the East area covering mostly in Norfolk, Suffolk & Essex, and another from the West area which covers from Cambridge, serving mostly Cambridgeshire, Northamptonshire and the three counties.

Services

Television
BBC East'''s television output (broadcast on BBC One) consists of its flagship regional news service BBC Look East, including an opt-out service for the west of the region and a 30-minute Sunday morning politics programme.

Former programmes include Weekend, East on Two, Matter of Fact and the football magazine show Late Kick Off (produced by the independent production company Kevin Piper Media).

Radio
The region is the controlling centre for BBC Radio Norfolk, BBC Radio Suffolk,  BBC Essex, BBC Radio Cambridgeshire, BBC Radio Northampton and BBC Three Counties Radio.

On weekdays, all six stations open transmission at 4am with a shared regional early morning show before carrying local programming between 6am and 10pm. There is also a shared regional programme broadcast across the stations from 10pm to 1am on weeknights, except for BBC Essex who has a stand-alone schedule, and other shared programmes at weekends.

Online and InteractiveBBC East also produces regional news and local radio pages for BBC Red Button and the BBC Local News websites for each county.

History

In the mid-1950s, the BBC had a temporary headquarters in Norwich at No. 35 All Saints Green. In September 1956 they moved to a new, larger headquarters at the nearby St Catherine's Close. From here, editions of radio programmes such as Midlands Miscellany were broadcast into the Midlands Home Service before the end of 1956.

The opening of the Tacolneston transmitting station enabled programmes to be broadcast from Norwich purely for East Anglia on the VHF edition of the Home Service, and regular broadcasts from St Catherine's Close began on Tuesday 5 February 1957. Daily news bulletins for East Anglia began on Monday 10 March 1958, on VHF from the Norwich studios, under the supervision of Richard Robinson.

The first television news bulletin for the east from St Catherine's Close was broadcast on 5 October 1959. In 1964, the programme was extended to 20 minutes in length and renamed Look East, a title the programme still goes under today.

The Norwich-based operation was initially a satellite of the larger BBC Midland region, based in Birmingham. East Anglia was given greater autonomy within the BBC in 1969 after the Broadcasting in the Seventies report recommended the large Midlands and East Anglia region should be split into two.

During 1997, an opt-out service (originally titled Close Up) was introduced to provide local bulletins for Northamptonshire, Bedfordshire, Cambridgeshire, Hertfordshire, Peterborough and Milton Keynes. This service provided separate teatime and late bulletins Monday to Friday in an area referred to on EPGs as BBC East (West) rather than BBC East (East) which is the sub-region for Norfolk, Suffolk and Essex. The last of these bulletins was broadcast on Friday 16 December 2022, as a result of the BBC restructuring of regional programming leading to budget cutbacks.

Until 1980, regional radio programming was provided by an East Anglia opt-out on BBC Radio 4, consisting largely of daytime news bulletins and a weekday breakfast show, Roundabout East Anglia. The first BBC Local Radio station in the region, Radio Norfolk, was opened on 11 September 1980 and followed by the rollout of stations in Cambridgeshire (1 May 1982), Northamptonshire (16 June 1982), the Three Counties of Bedfordshire, Hertfordshire & Buckinghamshire (24 June 1985), Essex (5 November 1986) and Suffolk (12 April 1990).

Studios

BBC East's main headquarters and studios are based at The Forum on Millennium Plain in Norwich, having moved from St Catherine's Close in 2003. The move to The Forum was a result of a number of factors: the listed status of the building restricted much of what the BBC did there, the location was less central than the BBC wanted, their ideal location being in Norwich city centre, the equipment was becoming old and needed replacing, and the Disability Discrimination Act meant that their headquarters now needed major modifications to comply with the law.

BBC East also has radio and television studios at the Cambridge Business Park, on Cowley Road in the city, where Radio Cambridgeshire is based and formerly home to the West opt-out of Look East''. Local radio studios and television bureaux are also located in Chelmsford, Northampton, Ipswich, and Dunstable.

See also

BBC English Regions

References

External links

East
Mass media in Norfolk
Mass media in Suffolk
Mass media in Northamptonshire
Mass media in Cambridgeshire
Mass media in Essex
Mass media in Bedfordshire
Mass media in Buckinghamshire
Mass media in Hertfordshire
Television channels and stations established in 1955
1955 establishments in the United Kingdom